WMJS-LP is a Full Service formatted low-power broadcast radio station licensed to and serving Prince Frederick, Maryland.  WMJS-LP is owned and operated by St. Paul's Episcopal Church.

Programming/Call Sign
While WMJS-LP is licensed to an Episcopal parish, the programming on the station is principally secular, with Adult Contemporary, Classic Hits and Country music and community-oriented programming broadcast.

The station was assigned the WMJS-LP call letters by the Federal Communications Commission on December 29, 2003.

References

External links
 102.1 WMJS Online
 

2004 establishments in Maryland
Full service radio stations in the United States
Radio stations established in 2004
MJS-LP
MJS-LP